Vanwykia is a genus of flowering plants belonging to the family Loranthaceae.

Its native range is Southern Africa and is found in the countries of Malawi, Mozambique, Tanzania, Zambia, Zimbabwe and the Northern Provinces within South Africa.

Known species
As accepted by Kew:
 Vanwykia remota (Baker & Sprague) Wiens 
 Vanwykia rubella Polhill & Wiens 

The genus name of Vanwykia is in honour of Pieter van Wyck (1931–2006), a South African botanist and ecologist. 
It was first described and published in Bothalia Vol.12 on page 422 in 1978.

References

Loranthaceae
Loranthaceae genera
Plants described in 1978
Flora of Tanzania
Flora of South Tropical Africa
Flora of the Northern Provinces